Rafael Schmitz (born 17 December 1980) is a retired Brazilian footballer. Born in Blumenau, Schmitz was a commanding central defender who was good in the air but also very agile and had good passing ability.

Career
Schmitz started his professional career at Malutrom, winning the 2000 Brazilian 3rd division. In 2001, he joined Lille OSC, where he spent six seasons and for whom he played 99 Ligue 1 games and appeared in the Champions League and UEFA Cup.
He joined Birmingham City on loan for the 2007–08 season on July 6, 2007. He made his Birmingham debut as a very late substitute on September 15, 2007 against Bolton Wanderers, and his first start on October 20, 2007 against Manchester City in place of the injured Johan Djourou. He returned to Lille following Birmingham's relegation at the end of the season.

On June 23, 2008, Schmitz signed a three-year contract with Valenciennes, where he played for four years before returning to Brazil and signing for Atlético Paranaense. After being overlooked at the club, he was about to sign for ABC on September, only for his club to decide against the deal in the last minute after Atlético needed defensive cover due to an injury suffered by Naldo. However, he only played two matches for Atlético Paranaense and left the club in 2013.

In 2018, Schmitz decided to return to professional football and trained with Metropolitano, a club based in his hometown. On 11 May 2018, he signed for the club to play the 2018 Campeonato Catarinense Série B. After achieving promotion to 2019 Campeonato Catarinense, he left the club.

Honours
Lille
UEFA Intertoto Cup: 2004

Notes

External links

Brazilian footballers
Brazilian expatriate footballers
Association football defenders
Lille OSC players
PFC Krylia Sovetov Samara players
Birmingham City F.C. players
Valenciennes FC players
Club Athletico Paranaense players
People from Blumenau
1980 births
Living people
Brazilian people of German descent
Premier League players
Ligue 1 players
Russian Premier League players
Expatriate footballers in France
Expatriate footballers in England
Expatriate footballers in Russia
Sportspeople from Santa Catarina (state)